Ishikawa 2nd district (石川[県第]2区, Ishikawa-[ken-dai-]ni-ku) is a single-member constituency of the House of Representatives, the lower house of the national Diet of Japan. It is located in Southern Ishikawa and covers the cities of Komatsu, Kaga, Nomi, Hakusan, Nonoichi and the (as administrative unit: former) Nomi county with only one remaining municipality: Kawakita town. As of 2012, 318,892 eligible voters were registered in the district giving it slightly above average voting weight.

The district's first representative after the electoral reform of the 1990s was Liberal Democrat Yoshirō Mori (Machimura faction) who had represented the pre-reform three-member Ishikawa 1st district since 1969. In April 2000, Mori was elected LDP president uncontested to replace Keizō Obuchi who had suffered an eventually fatal stroke, but resigned after one year. In the 2009 election when the LDP-led coalition lost its majority, Mori narrowly defended his district against Democratic newcomer Mieko Tanaka. In previous elections, Mori's main challenger had been reformist conservative former Liberal Democratic prefectural assemblyman Yasuo Ichikawa (LDP→JRP→NFP→LP→DPJ) who was elected in the proportional representation bloc three times and went on to become Councillor for Ishikawa in 2007.

In 2012, Mori retired. His son and former secretary Yūki Mori had resigned from his prefectural assembly seat in 2010 over a car accident under the influence. He died in 2011. The LDP candidacy in Ishikawa 2nd district went to political newcomer Hajime Sasaki, a former director of a building management company from Nomi City. Sasaki safely held the seat for the LDP.

List of representatives

Election results

References 

Ishikawa Prefecture
Districts of the House of Representatives (Japan)